Desmia peruviana is a moth in the family Crambidae. It was described by E. Hering in 1906. It is found in Ecuador (Loja Province) and Peru.

References

Moths described in 1906
Desmia
Moths of South America